Alan Ezequiel Ledesma (born 15 May 1998) is an Argentine professional footballer who plays as a centre-back for Paraguayan club Sportivo Luqueño.

Career
Ledesma began his senior footballing career in Primera B Nacional with Chacarita Juniors. He was moved into their first-team squad and given his professional debut on 10 March 2019, participating from the start of a home fixture against Ferro Carril Oeste. In April 2022, Ledesma signed for Paraguayan club Sportivo Luqueño.

Career statistics

References

External links

1998 births
Living people
Argentine footballers
Argentine expatriate footballers
Place of birth missing (living people)
Association football defenders
Primera Nacional players
Chacarita Juniors footballers
Sportivo Luqueño players
Argentine expatriate sportspeople in Paraguay
Expatriate footballers in Paraguay